The IIHF World U20 Championship Division I is played every year among the ice hockey teams under the age of 20 who were placed in Division I in the previous year.

Until 2001 the tournament was known as the B-series.

Results

Pool B

Champions (1979–2000)

References